Álvaro Gaspar Pinto (27 February 1912 – 27 April 1969), known as Gaspar Pinto, was a Portuguese footballer who played as a defender.

Over the course of 11 seasons he amassed Primeira Liga totals of 154 games and four goals, spending the majority of his career at Benfica, winning nine major titles.

Career
Born in Oeiras, Gaspar Pinto started in Carcavelinhos, where by the age of 21 he received his first call-up for the national team. After a short spell at Belenenses, he joined Benfica in 1934, making his debut on 3 February 1935, in a 1–2 loss against Porto, at the Estádio do Lima.

Capable of operating either as full back or half back, for the first part of his career, he played as half back, alongside Álvaro Pina, Albino, Baptista and Francisco Ferreira, and then descending down to full back, where his matches against Peyroteo from Sporting and Pinga from Porto gave him greater notability. 

He made his last official match in a 2–3 loss against Atlético on 9 June 1946, at Estádio Nacional, after representing the club for over 300 games. To celebrate his retirement, a farewell match against Olhanense was played on 9 September 1946.

International career
Gaspar Pinto gained 7 caps for Portugal and made his debut on 11 March 1934 in Madrid against Spain, in 9–0 defeat, in a qualification match for the 1934 World Cup. He made his last cap in a three-nil win against Switzerland on 1 January 1942.

Honours
Benfica
Primeira Divisão: 1935–36, 1936–37, 1937–38, 1941–42, 1942–43, 1944–45
Taça de Portugal (2): 1939–40, 1942–43
Campeonato de Portugal: 1934–35
Campeonato de Lisboa: 1939–40

References
General
 

Specific

External links
 
 

1912 births
1969 deaths
Footballers from Lisbon
People from Oeiras, Portugal
Portuguese footballers
Association football defenders
Primeira Liga players
Atlético Clube de Portugal players
C.F. Os Belenenses players
S.L. Benfica footballers
Portugal international footballers